Maurice Jean Désiré Aubert (8 May 1914 – 8 December 2005) was a French geologist.

See also

 Legion of Honour
 Legion of Honour Museum 
 List of Legion of Honour recipients by name (A)
 Ribbons of the French military and civil awards

1914 births
2005 deaths
Chevaliers of the Légion d'honneur
20th-century French geologists
Place of birth missing